Antheroporum is a genus of flowering plants in the legume family, Fabaceae. It belongs to the subfamily Faboideae.

Species of this genus include: 

 Antheroporum glaucum
 Antheroporum pierrei
 Antheroporum puudjaae

References 

Millettieae
Fabaceae genera